Harold Shukman (23 March 1931 – 11 July 2012) was a British historian, specialising in the history of Russia.

Shukman was born in London to a family of Jewish immigrants escaping from the Russian Empire. His father, David Shukman, whose first name he gave to his first born son David Shukman, was part of the Jewish community who lived in Baranow, Congress Poland, before emigrating and settling in the United Kingdom. After college and national service, he took the Russian course at the Joint Services School for Linguists, in Cambridge and Bodmin, Cornwall. Afterwards, he went on to study Russian and Serbo-Croat at the University of Nottingham, gaining a first-class degree. He received his PhD from Oxford University, his topic being the Jewish Labour Bund. Having completed his doctorate in 1960, he took up an academic career at Oxford where he eventually became the director of the Russian centre at St Antony's College. He retired in 1998.

In addition to numerous academic works, he also translated books by Anatoli Rybakov (Heavy Sand and Children of the Arbat) and a 1994 biography of Vladimir Lenin by Dmitri Volkogonov.

Shukman was married twice. His first wife was Ann King-Farlow, also a Russian scholar, and his second wife Barbara Shukman who is a granddaughter of Benjamin Guggenheim and Florette Seligman Guggenheim, an artist. His son, Henry Shukman, is a travel writer and novelist. Another son, David Shukman, is a science journalist.

Selected works
 Lenin and the Russian Revolution (1967) 
 Stalin (1999)
 A History of World Communism (1975) (with William Deakin and H.T. Willetts)
 
 
 (ed.) The Blackwell Encyclopedia of the Russian Revolution (1988) 
 (ed.) Agents for Change: Intelligence Services in the 21st Century (2000)
 Secret Classrooms: An Untold Story of the Cold War (2006) (with Geoffrey Elliott)
 War or Revolution: Russian Jews and Conscription in Britain, 1917 (2006)

References

External links 
 Full text of doctoral thesis, "The relations between the Jewish Bund and the RSDRP, 1897-1903" via the Oxford Research Archive

1931 births
2012 deaths
Jewish historians
British historians
Alumni of the University of Nottingham
Alumni of the University of Oxford
Fellows of St Antony's College, Oxford
Slavists
Russian–English translators
Historians of Russia
British Jews
British people of Russian-Jewish descent
Academics from London
20th-century translators
Shukman family